Jos Nosy-Bé is a Malagasy football club based in Nosy Be, Madagascar. The team has won Madagascar's top level THB Champions League in 1987, qualifying them for the 1988 African Cup of Champions Clubs.

As of 2014, Jos Nosy-Bé was playing in the Malagasy Second Division.

Achievements
THB Champions League Champion: 1987

Performance in CAF competitions
CAF Champions League: 1 appearance
1988 African Cup of Champions Clubs - first round

References

Football clubs in Madagascar